Julio Reyes (born January 15, 1982, in Hollywood, California) is an American contemporary artist. Reyes grew up in Los Angeles and was an athlete when he was young. But he had a greater passion with art and earned a Bachelor of Fine Arts in painting and drawing with a minor in sculpture at the Laguna College of Art and Design in 2005.

In 2011, Reyes had his debut solo exhibition at Arcadia Gallery in New York. Reyes’s work has been exhibited all around the world and awarded with numerous prizes by Portrait Society of America, the Art Renewal Center, the California Art Club.

Biography 
Reyes was born in Hollywood and was raised in the urban area of Los Angeles. In his youth, Reyes was a talented athlete and soccer player who had brought recruiters calling with offers of scholarships. Reyes had played in championship games around the world and could have taken the path of a professional soccer player. But on a team trip to France, he decided instead to pursue a career in art.

In grade school, Reyes discovered that he was partially colorblind. He has difficulty in distinguishing between reds, greens, purples, and blues, as well as between warms and cools. As a result, Reyes had to learn careful color mixing based on his weaknesses.

After graduating from college, Reyes married a fellow artist, Candice Bohannon. They have relocated to Texas, where they start offering workshops for the first time.

Painting style 
The human capacity to love, dream, and preserve is the source of inspiration in Reyes's art. His works focus on intimate dramas, revealing brief moments of unnoticed grandeur that are often missed in the hustle of modern existence and tender souls grappling with the pressures of life.

One appealing and powerful feature is Reyes' subtle use of color in predominantly monochromatic artworks. He stays away from drastic color mixes, which is partially due to his color blindness.

Exhibitions

Solo exhibitions 
 2020, Arcadia Contemporary, Los Angeles 
 2014, Vessels, Arcadia Contemporary, New York 
 2011, Premier Exhibition, Arcadia Gallery, New York

Group exhibitions 
 2016, "International Art Renewal Center Salon Exhibition", Museum of Modern Art (MEAM) Barcelona, Spain 
 2016, Water Water Everywhere, Arcadia Contemporary, Los Angeles 
 2015, Paintguide, The Unit Gallery, London, England

References

External links 
 Artwork by Julio Reyes

1982 births
Living people
21st-century American painters
21st-century American male artists
American contemporary painters
American male painters
Artists from California